Sven Schipplock (born 8 November 1988) is a German professional footballer who plays as a centre-forward for fourth tier side VfB Stuttgart II.

Career
After making a name for himself in the Regionalliga Süd with SSV Reutlingen he moved to VfB Stuttgart in 2008 where he initially played for the second team in the newly formed third division 3. Liga. He made his Bundesliga debut for the first team on 30 October 2010 in an away game against VfL Wolfsburg, where he came on as a substitute in the 80th minute.

On 22 January 2011, he debuted in the starting line-up against Borussia Dortmund at Signal Iduna Park.

His first Bundesliga goal came on 12 March 2011 in the crucial away game to FC St. Pauli where he scored the 88th-minute winner in a 2–1 victory that lifted his club out of the Bundesliga relegation zone. He had only been on the field for six minutes when he struck his goal, a well-taken shot from outside the box into the bottom corner.

On 9 May 2011, Bundesliga club TSG 1899 Hoffenheim announced it has signed Schipplock on a three-year contract.

On 17 August 2014, Schipplock scored five goals in round 1 of DFB-Pokal where 1899 Hoffenheim beat 9–0 USC Paloma to pass the round.

On 24 July 2015, it was announced that Schipplock had signed for Hamburger SV on a three-year contract for around £1.75 million.

On 17 August 2016, Schipplock joined Darmstadt 98 on a season-long loan.

In 2018, Schipplock signed for Arminia Bielefeld on a three-year deal.

References

External links
 

Living people
1988 births
People from Reutlingen
Sportspeople from Tübingen (region)
German footballers
Footballers from Baden-Württemberg
Association football forwards
Bundesliga players
3. Liga players
2. Bundesliga players
SSV Reutlingen 05 players
VfB Stuttgart players
VfB Stuttgart II players
TSG 1899 Hoffenheim players
Hamburger SV players
SV Darmstadt 98 players
Arminia Bielefeld players